Antonia Becherer (born 7 June 1963 in Konstanz, Baden-Württemberg) is a German former ice dancer. With her twin brother Ferdinand Becherer, she was a three-time German national champion. They placed 9th at the 1988 Winter Olympics. They represented the club Konstanzer ERC.

Results
(with Ferdinand Becherer)

References
 
 ISU statistics

1963 births
Living people
People from Konstanz
Sportspeople from Freiburg (region)
German female ice dancers
Figure skaters at the 1988 Winter Olympics
Olympic figure skaters of West Germany